David Dunlop may refer to:

 David Dunlop (sailor) (1859–1931), Scottish Olympic sailor
 David Colin Dunlop (1897–1968), Anglican bishop
 David Dunlop (RAAF officer) (born 1949), retired Australian Air Vice Marshal
 David Dunlop (cricketer) (1855–1898), New Zealand cricketer
 Dave Dunlop (born 1965), Canadian musician

See also
 David Alexander Dunlap (1863−1924), Canadian lawyer, mining company executive and philanthropist